John Huddleston (25 November 1837 – 1904) was an Australian cricketer. He played five first-class cricket matches for Victoria between 1860 and 1863.

See also
 List of Victoria first-class cricketers

References

1837 births
1904 deaths
Australian cricketers
Victoria cricketers
Cricketers from Nottingham